Derek Holmes (born August 15, 1939) is a Canadian retired ice hockey player, coach, administrator, and agent. He served as captain of the Eastern Canadian national team during the late 1960s, and was the technical director of Hockey Canada from 1974 to 1980. He managed the Canadian national teams at the 1977 and 1978 World Ice Hockey Championships, and helped build the 1980 Winter Olympics team. Holmes spent many years on the international ice hockey stage, which included being head coach of Team Finland and Team Switzerland, and later as an international ice hockey agent signing many players to European teams. He was inducted into the builder category of the IIHF Hall of Fame in 1999, the Ottawa Sports Hall of Fame in 2021, and is a double inductee into the Kemptville District Sports Hall of Fame.

Player and coach
Holmes was born in Kemptville, Ontario, on August 15, 1939. He played primarily as a centre, and had a right-hand shot. He played minor ice hockey locally in Kemptville, then joined the Kemptville Royals at age 15, and later won a Citizen Shield with the team in 1957. Holmes played junior ice hockey for the Ottawa Shamrocks, and the Toronto St. Michael's Majors. While playing for the Majors, he attended St. Michael's College School. At age 19, Holmes chose to leave the Majors, and play in Europe.

Holmes played for the Wembley Lions of the British National League during the 1959–60 season. He commented that "it was the best thing that ever happened to me". He later coached a club team in Finland, and was head coach of the Finland men's national ice hockey team for the 1961 World Ice Hockey Championships. Finland had 1 win, 1 tie, and 5 losses, placing seventh overall.

Holmes began the 1962–63 season on the Windsor Bulldogs in the OHA Senior A League, then finished with the Kemptville-Prescott Combines team in the Ottawa District Hockey Association (ODHA). The team shared home games between Kemptville and Prescott, and won the ODHA Senior A championship in a three-game sweep versus the Ottawa Montagnards. Holmes was captain of this team which reached the Eastern Canada quarterfinals for the 1963 Allan Cup.

Holmes returned to Europe between 1963 and 1966, playing for EC Kitzbühel in Austria, HC La Chaux-de-Fonds, EV Zug, and HC Ambrì-Piotta in Switzerland; was the most valuable player during the 1965 Spengler Cup tournament, and won a championship in the Swiss National League. During these years, he spent time as a player-coach for the Switzerland men's national ice hockey team, and the Austria men's national ice hockey team.

Holmes returned to Canada again, and played senior hockey in Morrisburg during the 1966–67 season. He then joined the Canada men's national ice hockey team, when it was divided into western and eastern branches. Holmes played for head Jack Bownass, and was named captain of the Eastern National Team. He played three season for the Eastern National team from 1967 to 1970, but did not play in the 1968 Winter Olympics due to a knee injury, and later graduated from Carleton University with a degree in history.

Holmes also played senior ice hockey for the Ottawa Nationals during the 1968–69 season, and his final year as a player was the 1969–70 season, playing for the Rochester Junior Americans, and the Syracuse Stars. Holmes was head coach of the Switzerland men's national ice hockey team at the 1972 World Ice Hockey Championships, and the 1972 Winter Olympics. He returned to Canada and coached the Ottawa M and W Rangers team in the Central Canada Hockey League during the 1972–73 season, which included future International Ice Hockey Federation medical officer, Mark Aubry. The Rangers finished the season with 30 wins and 5 ties, in 55 games played.

Hockey Canada
Holmes was recruited by Doug Fisher and Lou Lefaive while he was coaching Switzerland at the 1972 World Ice Hockey Championships, to become a full-time employee for Hockey Canada. He began working for Hockey Canada in April 1974, and said its purpose was to "beat the Russians". He served as the technical director from 1974 to 1980, and summarized his work with Hockey Canada as being a project coordinator, administrator, and scouting Team Canada players for the Ice Hockey World Championships, and the 1980 Winter Olympics.

Hockey Canada reorganized its structure in July 1976, and Holmes' title was executive secretary-treasurer at the time. Holmes scouted the competition at the 1976 Ice Hockey World Championships, and predicted that no country would dominate the upcoming 1976 Canada Cup. He later felt that Team Canada was favoured, on a team assembled by Sam Pollock. Holmes said that reestablishing the Canadian Olympic hockey team became more likely, due to the 1976 Canada Cup allowing best-on-best competition for Canada. The Canadian Interuniversity Athletics Union proposed developing a university team for the 1980 Winter Olympics, but Holmes thought that it would exclude deserving junior ice hockey players. Holmes supported Father David Bauer being put in charge of a committee for selecting a team for the 1980 Winter Olympics.

Hockey Canada selected Holmes as the committee chairman for the 1977 World Ice Hockey Championships team. The event was to be Canada's return to the Ice Hockey World Championships since its withdrawal from international play in 1970, and he anticipated using National Hockey League (NHL) and World Hockey Association (WHA) players whose teams had been eliminated from the playoffs. He and assistant Bill Watters compiled the tournament roster. Holmes said that Canadians had low expectations for the national team at the 1977 World Ice Hockey Championships, and "I think there are a lot of awfully good hockey players who never got a chance to play on a Team Canada."

He searched for a coach that would bring new ideas to the team, possibly an amateur or college coach. Johnny Wilson was later appointed coach of Team Canada. Holmes served as an assistant coach to Wilson, along with Phil Esposito. He stressed that Canada needed to be disciplined on the ice, due to the lengthy trip, roster size, and style of international play. After a fourth-place finished at the 1977 World Ice Hockey Championships, Holmes said the team was not disciplined enough, and that roster limitations prevented Team Canada from replacing those players. He recommended going back to a permanent national team similar to Father Bauer's team in the 1960s.

Holmes and Watters resumed the same roles in managing the 1978 World Ice Hockey Championships team. Holmes spent extensive time scouting the opposition teams between championships. They aimed for a more disciplined team for international play. In 1978, he had difficulties getting commitments from players for the national team, since the NHL and the WHA were signing players to minor league contracts, instead of allowing them to play internationally. Holmes stated that European countries began to have the same difficulty as Canada, due to professionals being unavailable due to NHL and WHA schedules. Holmes served as an assistant coach again for the 1978 World Ice Hockey Championships. Canada improved to a third-place finish in 1978.

Holmes attended tryouts for Team Canada at the 1980 Winter Olympics in the summer of 1978, working with Father Bauer and Georges Larivière to build a team. Holmes' plan for the national program was to make a junior team for the World Juniors, and a senior team for other tournaments. He assessed played on self-discipline, and characters, looked for more innovative coaching techniques. He selected 65 players from those available at the junior, senior, and college levels, and those playing in Europe as amateurs, for further evaluation. He also considered asking NHL and WHA teams to assign draft picks to Team Canada, rather than being signed to minor league contracts. The team played exhibition games versus NHL and WHA teams, and international tournaments including the Izvestia Cup. Canada finished sixth-place in ice hockey at the 1980 Winter Olympics.

In January 1980, Lou Lefaive became president of Hockey Canada, which lessened administrative duties from Holmes who then focused on technical director duties. Holmes resigned his position on March 31, 1980, without giving a reason. Author William Houston speculated that Holmes had grown tired of working with Alan Eagleson. Holmes said later in an interview, that Eagleson never felt his actions were wrong, that he could do anything he wanted regardless of the opinions of others, and took credit where it wasn't due. Holmes was at the Hotel International Prague during the 1972 World Ice Hockey Championships, and said that Eagleson did not take part in the 1972 Summit Series negotiations, and was actually told to mind his own business.

Player agent
Holmes became an international ice hockey player agent after leaving Hockey Canada, and by May 1980 he had helped over 40 players sign contracts in Europe since the merger of the World Hockey Association and the National Hockey League in 1979. Holmes expected the number of Canadians playing in Europe would continue to increase, until teams reached the league regulations which limit the number of imports to two players per team. Holmes used his worldwide connections to find a contract for Garry Monahan with contract in Japan, and negotiated a tentative deal for Denis Potvin to play in Europe.

Other notable clients of Holmes have included, Fran Huck, Dale McCourt, Rick Middleton, Morris Mott, Danny O'Shea, and Kevin O'Shea. Holmes was contacted by the planned Global Hockey League in 1990 to be an associated player agent, but he declined stating that it was poorly planned, and he would not represent Canadians in the league.

Honours and awards
During his career, Holmes was involved in the national teams for Canada, Finland, Switzerland and Austria, and while with Hockey Canada, he supported Chinese players seeking experience in Canada. In 1999, Holmes was inducted into IIHF Hall of Fame in the builder category. He was inducted into Kemptville District Sports Hall of Fame as an individual sportsman in 2012, and then inducted a second time in 2017, as a member of the 1962–63 Kemptville-Prescott Combines hockey team. In 2021, he was inducted into the Ottawa Sports Hall of Fame.

References

Bibliography
 
 
 

1939 births
Living people
Austria men's national ice hockey team coaches
Businesspeople from Ottawa
Canada men's national ice hockey team players
Canadian expatriate ice hockey players in England
Canadian expatriate ice hockey players in Switzerland
Canadian ice hockey centres
Canadian ice hockey coaches
Canadian sports agents
Canadian sports executives and administrators
Carleton University alumni
EV Zug players
Finland men's national ice hockey team coaches
HC Ambrì-Piotta players
HC La Chaux-de-Fonds players
Hockey Canada personnel
Ice hockey people from Ottawa
Ice hockey player-coaches
IIHF Hall of Fame inductees
People from Leeds and Grenville United Counties
Switzerland men's national ice hockey team coaches
Toronto St. Michael's Majors players
Wembley Lions players
Windsor Bulldogs (OHA) players